Adventures of Tron is a platform video game produced by Mattel in 1982 and the Atari 2600 version of the Intellivision video game Tron: Maze-A-Tron. It is based on the Disney film Tron.  Following the loss of the license, the game was re-released as Adventures on GX-12.

Gameplay

In the game the player controls Tron, who has to avoid a variety of attackers whilst navigating a grid with four floors.  Several aspects of the film appear in the game, including Recognizers, Tanks and Solar Sailers.

Reception
The game received fairly positive reviews from critics.

References

External links
Adventures of Tron at Atari Mania
Adventures of Tron at AtariAge

Atari 2600 games
Intellivision games
1982 video games
Tron video games
Video games developed in the United States